Robert Matthew Byrne (December 31, 1884 – December 31, 1964) was a third baseman in Major League Baseball. From  through , he played for the St. Louis Cardinals (1907–1909), Pittsburgh Pirates (1909–1913), Philadelphia Phillies (1913–1917) and Chicago White Sox (1917). Byrne batted and threw right-handed. He was born in St. Louis, Missouri.

Baseball

The speedy Byrne was a defensive stalwart with excellent range. He started his major league career with the St. Louis Cardinals in the 1907 season. Acquired by the Pittsburgh Pirates in late August 1909, he contributed for his new club down the stretch, including allowing Tommy Leach to stay in center field. Used mainly in the leadoff spot, Byrne made just two errors while hitting .256 with eight stolen bases. 
 

Despite a low .259 average in 1911, Byrne scored 96 runs with 23 stolen bases and set career highs in triples (17) and games played (153). He raised to .288 in 1912, adding 31 doubles, 11 triples, and 20 steals.

In the 1913 midseason Byrne was traded by Pittsburgh along with pitcher Howie Camnitz to the Philadelphia Phillies in exchange for utility Cozy Dolan and cash considerations. In 1917 he was selected off waivers by the Chicago White Sox from the Phillies, making his last major league appearance in the 1917 World Series. 
 
In an 11-season career, Byrne was a .254 hitter (1225-for-4831) with 10 home runs and 331 RBI in 1283 games. He also collected 176 stolen bases and posted an above average walk-to-strikeout ratio of 2.07 (456-to-220).

Soccer
Byrne played soccer in the St. Louis Soccer League during the off-season.  When he signed with the Pirates, team president Barney Dreyfuss ordered him to give it up.
 
Following his baseball career, Byrne was owner of a bowling alley in St. Louis.

Bobby Byrne died in Wayne, Pennsylvania on his 80th birthday.

See also
 List of Major League Baseball annual doubles leaders
 List of Major League Baseball career stolen bases leaders

Sources
Baseball Library

The Deadball Era

References

External links

American soccer players
Major League Baseball third basemen
Pittsburgh Pirates players
Chicago White Sox players
Philadelphia Phillies players
St. Louis Cardinals players
Soccer players from St. Louis
Baseball players from St. Louis
1884 births
1964 deaths
Fort Scott Giants players
Springfield Highlanders players
Shreveport Pirates (baseball) players
St. Louis Soccer League players
Association footballers not categorized by position
Burials at Calvary Cemetery (St. Louis)
Miami Indians players